Johan Alberto Cruz de la Cruz (born 8 October 1987) is a Dominican footballer who plays as a defender. He played at the 2014 FIFA World Cup qualifier.

References

External links
 

1987 births
Living people
Dominican Republic footballers
Dominican Republic international footballers
Association football defenders
Atlético Pantoja players
Delfines del Este FC players
Liga Dominicana de Fútbol players
People from La Romana, Dominican Republic